Childers Hill is an unincorporated community in Hardin County, Tennessee. Childers Hill is located south of Savannah and west of the Tennessee River.

Demographics

References

Unincorporated communities in Hardin County, Tennessee
Unincorporated communities in Tennessee